Passion is the sixth studio album by British extreme metal band Anaal Nathrakh. It was released on 17 May 2011 by Candlelight Records. The album features guest appearances by Drugzilla, Rainer Landfermann, Ventnor and Alan Dubin.

Track listing

Personnel

Anaal Nathrakh
Dave Hunt – vocals
Mick Kenney – guitars, bass, drum programming, production, recording, mixing

Additional personnel
Drugzilla – samples ("Post Traumatic Stress Euphoria")
Rainer Landfermann – vocals ("Tod Huetet Uebel")
Barm "Ventnor" Frog – lead guitar ("Paragon Pariah")
Alan Dubin – vocals ("Ashes Screaming Silence")
Mories "Gnaw Their Tongues" de Jong – sounds and samples ("Portrait of the Artist")
Anaal Nathrakh – arrangement

References

Anaal Nathrakh albums
2011 albums
Candlelight Records albums